The Geology of Puerto Rico "can be divided into three major geologic provinces: The Cordillera Central, the Carbonate, and the Coastal Lowlands." Puerto Rico is composed of Jurassic to Eocene volcanic and plutonic rocks, which are overlain by younger Oligocene to recent carbonates and other sedimentary rocks. Most of the caverns and karst topography on the island occurs in the northern Oligocene to recent carbonates. The oldest rocks are approximately 190 million years old (Jurassic) and are located at Sierra Bermeja in the southwest part of the island. These rocks may represent part of the oceanic crust and are believed to come from the Pacific Ocean realm.

During the Carboniferous period, Puerto Rico was submerged.

Puerto Rico lies at the boundary between the Caribbean and North American plates. This means that it is currently being deformed by the tectonic stresses caused by the interaction of these plates. These stresses may cause earthquakes and tsunamis. These seismic events, along with landslides, represent some of the most dangerous geologic hazards in the island and in the northeastern Caribbean. The largest, most recent major earthquake occurred on October 11, 1918, and had an estimated magnitude of 7.5 on the Richter scale. It originated off the coast of Aguadilla and was accompanied by a tsunami. On September 24, 2019, an earthquake over 6.0 was recorded 49 miles off the island's northwest coast at a shallow depth of 6 miles. It was recorded by the United States Geological Survey (USGS) organization.

At this trench the North American plate is being subducted by the Caribbean plate. This subduction zone is responsible for the volcanism of the West Indies to the southeast of Puerto Rico. A major transform fault extends from the Puerto Rico trench along the northern coast of Puerto Rico and on through the Cayman Trough to the coast of Central America. Approximately 50 miles ESE of Fajardo, Puerto Rico, past the island of Vieques and approximately 20 miles south of Saint Thomas in the US Virgin Islands, can be found the Virgin Islands Trough, which in places exceeds 14,000 feet in depth.

Gallery

See also

 Geography of Puerto Rico
List of earthquakes in Puerto Rico
 Seismology

References

External links